Lieutenant General Sir David Robert Bill,  (born 17 November 1954) is a senior British Army officer who served as Commandant of the Royal College of Defence Studies.

Early life and education
Bill was born on 17 November 1954 to Robert Bill, DSO, RN and Wendy Jean Bill (née Booth). He was educated at Charterhouse School and Welbeck College.

Military career
Bill was commissioned into the Royal Engineers in 1973. After commanding 33 Independent Field Squadron in Northern Ireland, he became commanding officer of 39 Engineer Regiment at Waterbeach. He was posted to UK Land Forces in 1997 first as Commander, Royal Engineers and then as Brigadier, General Staff.

Promoted to major general in 2002, Bill became General Officer Commanding UK Support Command (Germany) at Rheindahlen. He went on to be Deputy Commander NATO Rapid Deployable Corps (Italy) in September 2006 and UK Military Representative to NATO in October 2008. He became Commandant of the Royal College of Defence Studies in 2012.

Family
Bill is married to Gabrielle; they have two sons and a daughter.

References

|-

|-

1954 births
Living people
British Army lieutenant generals
Knights Commander of the Order of the Bath
People educated at Charterhouse School
Royal Engineers officers
British military personnel of The Troubles (Northern Ireland)
People educated at Welbeck Defence Sixth Form College